Jessica Barnett (born June 5, 1991 in North Vancouver, British Columbia) is a female field hockey player, who played for the Canada national field hockey team as a defender at the 2014 Commonwealth Games. She attended the University of Iowa, where she was a two time All-American while playing for the Hawkeyes.

References

External links
 
 

1991 births
Living people
Canadian female field hockey players
Field hockey people from British Columbia
Field hockey players at the 2014 Commonwealth Games
Sportspeople from North Vancouver
Commonwealth Games competitors for Canada
Iowa Hawkeyes field hockey players
University of Iowa alumni